John James Clark (23 January 1838 – 25 June 1915), an Australian architect, was born in Liverpool, England. Clark's 30 years in public service, in combination with 33 in private practice, produced some of Australia's most notable public buildings, as well as at least one prominent building in New Zealand.

Biography
John James Clark, commonly referred to as JJ, was born in Liverpool, England on 23 January 1838 to parents George and Mary Clark. Clark was one of nine children. The family relocated from Liverpool to Melbourne, Australia in March 1852, in hopes of capitalising on the Victorian gold rush. Prior to leaving he had attended Collegiate College, Liverpool, where at thirteen he won first prize for drawing a finely detailed map of Liverpool – every street, all public buildings and docks, Whilst his father and older brother sought reward working in the gold fields, 14-year-old Clark pursued his interest in architecture and on the basis of his revealed abilities, was employed on 26 April 1852 as a draftsman for the Colonial Architect's Office. Clark continued in public service until 1878 when he was retrenched in the Black Wednesday dismissals. He took a brief sabbatical in 1858 to tour Europe

In 1865 Clark married Mary Taylor Watmuff (1844–1871) they remained married until her early death at the age of 26 in 1871. The couple had one child, Edward James, in 1868.  In 1889 when Edward was 21, Clark took him on a tour of Europe and America, mirroring that of the one Clark took in his own youth. An artistic pursuit learning under, and becoming a friend of, Louis Buvelot.

In 1880 Clark set up private practice in central Melbourne. Between 1881 and 1896 Clark relocated several times between Victoria, New South Wales, Queensland and Western Australia in pursuit of commissions and employment. One of Clark's most notable achievements, during this time, was his appointment as Queensland Colonial Architect. Results of this work scattered across Australia.

In 1896 Clark and his son formed a professional partnership that lasted until his death, and saw them complete works in Perth, Brisbane, Melbourne and Auckland, New Zealand. Clark died at his residence in St Kilda, Melbourne on 25 June 1915.

Clark is the subject of a biography published in 2012 by NewSouth books.

Works

Old Treasury Building

Old Treasury Building is considered by many as one of the finest examples of Renaissance Revival architecture in Melbourne. Clark began designing this building in 1857 when he was nineteen. Construction began in 1858 using bluestone, sourced from Broadmeadows for its foundations, and sandstone, from Baccus Marsh, for its intricate external facade. The building was completed in 1862. Originally the treasury was designed to hold Victoria's state gold, and also offices major colonial leaders. In 1874 the Treasury offices were relocated, however the building was still used weekly for meetings with the Governor General. In 1992 the building was restored, and from 2005 it was the home of the City Museum.

Melbourne City Baths

Designed by Clark and his son Edward James in 1904, the Melbourne City Baths were the result of a winning competition entry to redesign the existing baths.

A significant example of the Edwardian Baroque style, the building uses a bold two tone palette of red brick and cream yellow rendered concrete.  The highly articulated facade wraps around the corners of the site and displays multiple classical instances of cupolas, archways and triangular pediments that is considered by some as 'Federation Freestyle'.  These motifs also reflected a mesh of architectural styles popular in England and America at that time.

Melbourne Hospital which in 1946 became the Queen Victoria Women's Hospital

Clark and son Edward's original design for the Melbourne Hospital occupied an entire block in Melbourne's CBD.   In later years Queen Victoria Hospital was relocated and subsequently a significant portion of the building was deconstructed. Currently all that remains of the original design is one of the three pavilions that ran along Lonsdale, which is now known as the Queen Victoria Women's Centre, the rest of the block becoming the Queen Victoria Village.  The hospital was completed in 1913 in an Edwardian Baroque style. The design worked as a network of pavilions connected by a large central corridor that ran through the site.  Raised upon a bluestone base the red brick 'blood & bandage' building is ornamented with rendered concrete flanked by cupola topped turrets. The building's remnants are currently occupied by the Queen Victoria Women's Centre.

Further notable works

Victoria, Melbourne
1856	The Government Printing Office
1858	The Old Treasury Building
1860 The Port Melbourne Court House (originally known as Sandridge Police Court)
1871	The Royal Mint
1874	The Victorian Titles Office
1874	The Supreme Court
1874	Government House
1876	The Customs House
1903	The City Baths
1907	Women's Hospital
1907	Carlton Refuge
1912	Melbourne Hospital which in 1946 became the Queen Victoria Hospital (partially demolished in 1994)
-	The Port Melbourne Post Office

Victoria, Regional
1864 Aradale Mental Hospital (as assistant of G. W. Vivian)
1904	The Ballarat National Mutual Building
-	The Geelong Customs House
- 	The Geelong Supreme Court
- 	The Beechworth Mental Hospital
- 	The Sale Court House
- 	The Rutherglen Court House
- 	The Bright Post Office
- 	The Castlemaine Post Office
- 	The Yackandandah Post Office
- 	The Kilmore Post Office

Queensland
1894	The Brisbane Children's Hospital
1885	The Brisbane Treasury Building
1885	Townsville Post and Telegraph Office
1885	Townsville Hospital
1885	Charters Towers Courthouse
1885	Mackay Courthouse
1885	Kangaroo Point Immigration Centre (Yungaba Immigration Centre)
1895	The Booroodabin Public Baths
1901	Brisbane Central Railway Station
1901	an unexecuted design for the Townsville Railway Station
-	Gympie Town Hall (first stage)
-	Warwick Town Hall
-	Maryborough Railway Station
-	Brisbane Masonic Memorial Temple

New South Wales
1899	A new scheme for the Newcastle Hospital (of which only the Nurses' Quarters and operating Theatre were built)
1903	The Maitland Hospital
1862	A unexecuted design for the Sydney Free Public Library
1881	The Waverley Town Hall (unexecuted)
1882	The Orange Town Hall
1880 	The Wagga Wagga Town Hall (unexecuted)

Western Australia
1897	Perth St Andrew's Presbyterian Church
1897	Fremantle Town Hall, alterations and extensions
1898	Perth Royal Children's Hospital (unexecuted)
1898	Vasse Butter Factory

New Zealand
1907	Auckland Town Hall
-	A design for the Auckland Supreme Court
-	A design for a Christchurch Court House

Awards
Clark placed in 38 of the 47 competitions he entered throughout his career; of these, 24 were first placements.

Clark's obituary stated his partnership with son Edward James Clark, became his most professionally successfully period in respect to competition wins with the firm winning in succession competitions for:
Fremantle Town Hall Auditorium Alterations (Fremantle, 1897)
Saint Andrew's Presbyterian Church (Perth, 1897)
Royal Children's Hospital (Perth, 1898)
Newcastle Hospital (Newcastle, 1899)
Maitland Hospital (Maitland, 1903)
The City Baths (Melbourne, 1903)

Additionally in later years the firm successful campaigned for
National Mutual Building (Ballarat, 1904)
Women's Hospital (Melbourne, 1907)
Carlton Refuge (Melbourne, 1907)
Auckland Town Hall (Auckland, 1907 )
Melbourne Hospital (Melbourne, 1912)

His other competition awards were produced from individual work, partnerships and associations with architectural firms.

References

Further reading
Dodd, Andrew (2012): JJ Clark: Architect of the Australian Renaissance, University of New South Wales Press

Taylor, Florence (12 June 1917). "J.J. Clark: An Architectural Giant", Building, vol 20, no 118, pp 51–66. Retrieved 25 June 2022 – via State Library of Victoria.

External links
 

1838 births
1915 deaths
New South Wales architects
Architects from Queensland
Architects from Melbourne
19th-century Australian architects
20th-century Australian architects
Architects from Liverpool
English emigrants to Australia